This is the list of the scientists from Tamil Origin or Tamil Nadu
 Thomas Anantharaman
 Kailasavadivoo Sivan
 Mylswamy Annadurai
 V. S. R. 
 Elagu V. Elaguppillai
 Miruhubashini Govindarajan
 Ravindran Kanan
 Poondih Kumaraswamy
 C. Mohan
 A. Sivathanu Pillai
 G. N. Ramachandran
 Venkataraman Ramakrishnan
 C. V. Raman
 Shan Ratnam
 Ramaswami Venkataswami
 Glanapathgi Thanikaimoni
 P. S. Veeraraghavan
 Ramnuja Vijayaraghavan
 A. P. J. Abdul Kalam
 Kariamanickam Srinivasa Krishnan
 G. V Loganathan
 Mahadeva Subamania Mani
 Ramnujam Varatharaja Perumal
 Venktraman Radhakrishnan
 S.Ramachandran
 Srinivasa Ramanujan
 S.R. Ranganathan
 MohammedRela
 Vaidhyanathasamy Santhanam
 W Selvamurthy
 Shiva Ayyadurai
 M.S. Swaminathan
 Bhargav Sri dhPakash
 Nambi Narayanan